The Endeavor 26 is an American trailerable sailboat that was designed by Bill Lapworth as a racer  and day sailer and first built in 1963.

Production
The design was built by W. D. Schock Corp in the United States, from 1963 until 1967 with a total of 56 boats completed. It is now out of production.

Design
The Endeavor 26 is a racing keelboat, built predominantly of fiberglass, with wood trim. It has a fractional sloop rig; a spooned, raked stem, a raised counter, angled transom, a keel-mounted rudder controlled by a tiller and a fixed fin keel. It displaces  and carries  of lead ballast.

The design has sleeping accommodation for four people, with a double "V"-berth in the bow cabin and two straight settees in the main cabin. The head is located centered in the bow cabin under the "V"-berth.

See also
List of sailing boat types

References

Keelboats
1960s sailboat type designs
Sailing yachts
Trailer sailers
Sailboat type designs by Bill Lapworth
Sailboat types built by W. D. Schock Corp